"Boyfriend" is a single by Lou Bega from his fourth album Free Again.

Track listing
CD single
 "Boyfriend" - 2:51
 "Lucky Punch" - 2:31

Chart performance

Music video
The music video for "Boyfriend" is directed by Dave Coba and recorded in Berlin in the old Film Noir style. Lou Bega stated that playing a double role in the video “...hasn’t been easy”.

References

2010 singles
Lou Bega songs
2010 songs
Songs written by Lou Bega